Salgar is a town and municipality in the Colombian department of Antioquia. It is part of the subregion of Southwestern Antioquia.

The town was hit by a massive landslide in 2015.

References

Municipalities of Antioquia Department